Staphylococcus saccharolyticus is a Gram-positive, coagulase-negative, anaerobic member of the bacterial genus Staphylococcus consisting of single and clustered cocci.  The species was formerly known as Peptococcus saccharolyticus, but was reclassified on the basis of 16S ribosomal RNA and biochemical similarity to other members of Staphylococcus.

Pathogenicity
Staphylococcus saccharolyticus may be a cause of infective endocarditis.  This species is also known to contaminate samples of platelets taken from humans, though these contaminated samples generally do not cause S. saccharolyticus infections during transfusion.

References

External links
Type strain of Staphylococcus saccharolyticus at BacDive -  the Bacterial Diversity Metadatabase

saccharolyticus
Bacteria described in 1981